The women's ski slopestyle competition of the FIS Freestyle Ski and Snowboarding World Championships 2017 was held at Sierra Nevada, Spain on March 18 (qualifying)  and March 19 (finals). 
32 athletes from 17 countries competed.

Qualification
The following are the results of the qualification.

Final
The following are the results of the finals.

References

ski slopestyle, women's